Solar cycle 12 was the twelfth solar cycle since 1755, when extensive recording of solar sunspot activity began. The solar cycle lasted 11.3 years, beginning in December 1878 and ending in March 1890.  The maximum smoothed sunspot number observed during the solar cycle was 124.4 (December 1883), and the starting minimum was 3.7. During the minimum transit from solar cycle 12 to 13, there were a total of 736 days with no sunspots.

1882
A very bright blood-red aurora display happened over New York on 16 April 1882, while significant communication disturbances occurred. A geomagnetic storm later in that year produced the aurora of November 17, 1882.

See also
 List of solar cycles

References

Solar cycles